The 1954 NAIA basketball tournament was held in March at Municipal Auditorium in Kansas City, Missouri. The 17th annual NAIA basketball tournament featured 32 teams playing in a single-elimination format.

The Southwest Missouri State Bears were out to claim an unprecedented three straight national title, but Western Illinois handed them an upset in the National Semifinals, forcing the Bears to settle for third place.  The teams that played in the national championship game, were Western Illinois, and St. Benedict's (KS). St. Benedict's would defeat Western Illinois, 62–56. It was the first time these two teams had played in tournament history, and it was the first time two new teams met in the championship game since 1947.

Southwest Missouri State, now Missouri State, and the previous two time champion would settle for a third place victory over Arkansas Tech 75–61.

The 1954 tournament would see the beginning of one of the best players the NAIA had ever seen. Jim Spivey of Southeastern Oklahoma would begin his journey to most all time free throws made, and 4th on the all-time scoring list. It would also be the first year for the awarding of the Coach of the Year Award. This award goes to the best coach in the NAIA over the past year, which is not necessarily the tournament winning coach. The first award went to Sam Hindsman of Arkansas Tech.

The Georgetown Tigers make their first NAIA appearance. It would become a tournament record for most tournament appearances in 1974 with twelve, and in the 1990s would start a twenty-six year consecutive appearance streak, a tournament record.

Awards and honors
Many of the records set by the 1954 tournament have been broken, and many of the awards were established much later:
Leading scorer est. 1963
Leading rebounder est. 1963
Charles Stevenson Hustle Award est. 1958
Player of the Year est. 1994
Most free throws made; career: 120 free throws made by Jim Spivey of Southeastern Oklahoma State (1954,55,56,57). In 1954, Spivey began his four-year trek to tournament record.
Most tournament appearances: Georgetown (Ky.) 1954 would be the first of 36, as of 2017, appearances to the NAIA Tournament
All-time scoring leader; first appearance: James Spivey, 4th Southeastern Oklahoma State (1954,55,56,57), 13 games, 133 field goals, 120 free throws, totaling 386 points, 29.7 average per game.
All-time scoring leader; second appearance: James Miller, 18th, East Texas State (1953,54,55), 13 games, 103 field goals, 40 free throws, totaling 246 points, 18.9 average per game.
All-time scoring leader; third appearance: E.C. O’Neal, 9th, Arkansas Tech (1952,53,54,55), 13 games, 122 field goals, 43 free throws, totaling 287 points, 22.1 average per game.

Bracket

  * denotes overtime.

See also
 1954 NCAA basketball tournament
 1954 National Invitation Tournament

References

NAIA Men's Basketball Championship
Tournament
NAIA men's basketball tournament
NAIA men's basketball tournament